Centerville, Ohio is a city in Montgomery and Greene Counties in the U.S. state of Ohio.

Centerville, Ohio may also refer to: 
Centerville, Belmont County, Ohio
Centerville, Clinton County, Ohio or Lees Creek
Centerville, Gallia County, Ohio
Centerville, Marion County, Ohio
Centerville, Wayne County, Ohio

See also
Center Village, Ohio